The Governor of Stavropol Krai is the head of government of Stavropol Krai, a federal subject of Russia.

The position was introduced in 1991 as Head of Administration of Stavropol Krai. The Governor is elected by direct popular vote for a term of five years.

List of officeholders

References 

Politics of Stavropol Krai
 
Stavropol